From Man to Man (Spanish:De hombre a hombre) is a 1949 Argentine film directed by Hugo Fregonese. The film's art direction was by Germán Gelpi and Mario Vanarelli.

Cast
 Tito Alonso  
 Jorge Arias  
 Luis de Lucía   
 Cirilo Etulain
 Aurelia Ferrer    
 Rene Fischer Bauer   
 Norma Giménez  
 Josefa Goldar  
 Raúl Luar   
 Enrique Muiño   
 Nathán Pinzon    
 Osvaldo Terranova
 Ricardo Trigo

References

Bibliography 
 Rist, Peter H. Historical Dictionary of South American Cinema. Rowman & Littlefield, 2014.

External links
 

1949 films
1940s Spanish-language films
Argentine black-and-white films
Films directed by Hugo Fregonese
1940s Argentine films